Pedro Zamorano is a paralympic athlete from France competing mainly in category T37 middle-distance events.

Pedro competed in the 800m and 1500m at the 2000 Summer Paralympics before helping the French relay team to a silver medal in the 4 × 400 m.

References

External links 
 

Paralympic athletes of France
Athletes (track and field) at the 2000 Summer Paralympics
Paralympic silver medalists for France
Living people
Medalists at the 2000 Summer Paralympics
Year of birth missing (living people)
Paralympic medalists in athletics (track and field)
French male middle-distance runners
20th-century French people
21st-century French people